Modysticus is a genus of spiders in the family Thomisidae. It was first described in 1953 by Gertsch. , it contains 4 species found in the U.S. and Mexico.

References

Thomisidae
Araneomorphae genera
Spiders of North America